Janet Musindalo Okelo (born May 5, 1992) is a Kenyan rugby sevens player. She was a member of the Kenyan women's national rugby sevens team for the 2016 Summer Olympics.

References

External links 
 

Female rugby sevens players
Rugby sevens players at the 2016 Summer Olympics
Olympic rugby sevens players of Kenya
Kenya international rugby sevens players
1992 births
Living people
Rugby sevens players at the 2020 Summer Olympics
Kenya international women's rugby sevens players